Nestor Gomez (8 September 1875 – 9 March 1941) was a Brazilian politician. He was state representative in Espirito Santo's Chamber of Representatives, president (governor) of Espirito Santo, and Senator of Espirito Santo in the Brazilian Senate.

Gomez was born in Conceição de Macabu RJ. Although he was elected by the people for governor of Espirito Santo in early 1920, Jerônimo Monteiro, who was the governor Bernardino de Sousa Monteiro's brother and leader of the political party in charge in Espirito Santo, tried to impede Nestor Gomez from being inaugurated officially. Nestor Gomez had to march ahead of a group of more than 100 private gunmen across Vitoria, the capital city of Espirito Santo, to expel his predecessor and take the office by force.

1875 births
1941 deaths
Governors of Espírito Santo
Members of the Federal Senate (Brazil)